Masdevallia weberbaueri is a species of orchid found from southern Ecuador into northern Peru.

References

External links 

weberbaueri
Orchids of Ecuador
Orchids of Peru